The following is a list of notable people associated with Wichita State University, located in the American city of Wichita, Kansas.

University presidents

Fairmount College
 Nathan J. Morrison, 1895–1907
 Henry Thayer, 1907–1914
 Walter Rollins, 1914–1922
 John D. Finlayson, 1922–1927

Municipal University of Wichita
 Harold Foght, 1927–1934
 William M. Jardine, 1934–1949, President of Kansas State University, Secretary of Agriculture, United States Minister to Egypt
 Harry F. Corbin, 1949–1963

Wichita State University
 Emory K. Lindquist, 1963–1968, Rhodes Scholar, historian, President of Bethany College
 Clark D. Ahlberg, 1968–1983
 Warren B. Armstrong, 1983–1993
 Eugene M. Hughes, 1993–1998
 Donald L. Beggs, 1999–2012, President/Chancellor of Southern Illinois University
 John W. Bardo, 2012–2019, Chancellor of Western Carolina University
 Jay S. Golden, 2020–2020, Vice Chancellor of Research, East Carolina University
 Richard D. Muma, 2021–present, served as interim president from September 2020 until he became president on May 6, 2021

Faculty and staff
 Karen Countryman-Roswurm – professor in the School of Social Work and director of the University's Center for Combating Human Trafficking
 H. Edward Flentje – professor and former director of Hugo Wall School of Public Affairs; interim president of Emporia State University in 2011
 Albert Goldbarth – only poet to win the National Book Critics Circle award two times (1991 and 2001)
 Hyuck Kwon – professor in Electrical Engineering and Computer Science
 Bienvenido Santos – fiction, poetry, and nonfiction writer

Academia
 Dale Allison – biblical scholar, professor at Pittsburgh Theological Seminary
 M. Lee Pelton – current president of Emerson College
 Earl G. Yarbrough – former president of Savannah State University

Business
 Jim Bede – founder of Bede Aviation
 Gary Burrell – founder and CEO of Garmin
 Dan and Frank Carney – co-founders of Pizza Hut
 Vivek Lall – CEO of Reliance Industries
 Phil Ruffin – billionaire businessman, owns Treasure Island Hotel and Casino and Circus Circus Hotel & Casino in Las Vegas, attended WSU
 T. Russell Shields – technology entrepreneur, former CEO of Navteq
 Dwane Wallace – former CEO and chairman of Cessna

Government

 Valerie Baldwin – Assistant Secretary of the Army (Financial Management and Comptroller), 2004–06
 Robert Blackwill – diplomat, senior fellow at the Council of Foreign Relations, lobbyist, author
 Stanley Thomas Counts – United States Navy rear admiral
 Rebecca Ediger – US Secret Service agent
 Walter Orebaugh – Foreign Service Officer
 Femi Pedro – Deputy Governor of Lagos State, Nigeria
 Riley Pitts, US Army – first African-American commissioned officer to be awarded the Congressional Medal of Honor
 Tom Sawyer – member of the Kansas House of Representatives, former House Majority Leader, 1998 Kansas Democratic Party nominee for Governor
 Matt Schlapp — political activist, lobbyist, and chairman of American Conservative Union
 Garner Shriver – eight-term US Representative from Kansas
 Sandiaga Uno – Minister of Tourism and Creative Economy of Indonesia, previously Deputy Governor of Jakarta, businessman

Literature
 Craig Blais – poet 
 Paul Dickey – poet
 Omar Khalidi – author, Muslim scholar
 Michael McClure – poet, playwright, songwriter, and novelist
 Janet Peery – short story author and novelist
 Charles Plymell – poet, novelist, and small press publisher

Media
 James Pringle Cook – Western landscape painter
 Erin Dagon-Mitchell – actress, director, playwright
 Shirley Knight – Oscar-nominated actress
 Lance LeGault – actor
 Bob Peak – painter dubbed the "father of the modern movie poster"
 Rosé – drag queen
 Kate Snodgrass – theatre director and playwright

Music
 Chris Arpad – solo steel pannist
 James Billings – operatic baritone, opera librettist, and opera director
 Karla Burns – Drama Desk Award and Laurence Olivier Award-winning actress and operatic mezzo-soprano
 Joyce DiDonato – opera star
 Kevin Kastning – modern classical composer and guitarist
 Samuel Ramey – opera star
 Michael Sylvester – opera star

Science and technology
 Lincoln LaPaz – astronomer at University of New Mexico, pioneer in the study of meteors
 Adisak Mekkittikul – computer engineer
 Harold G. White – mechanical engineer, aerospace engineer, and applied physicist; Advanced Propulsion Team Lead for the NASA Engineering Directorate

Sports

Sportscasting
 Gary Bender – sportscaster

Baseball

 Casey Blake – Major League Baseball player
 Alec Bohm (born 1996) – baseball player in the Philadelphia Phillies
 Joe Carter – Major League Baseball player
 Andy Dirks – Major League Baseball player
 Darren Dreifort – Major League Baseball player with the Los Angeles Dodgers
 Conor Gillaspie – Major League Baseball player for the Chicago White Sox
 Koyie Hill – Major League Baseball player
 Mike Lansing – Major League Baseball player
 Don Lock – Major League Baseball player with the Washington Senators
 Braden Looper – Major League Baseball player for the Milwaukee Brewers and Saint Louis Cardinals
 Pat Meares – Major League Baseball player
 Doug Mirabelli – Major League Baseball player with the Boston Red Sox
 Charlie O'Brien – Major League Baseball player
 Michael Pelfrey – Major League Baseball player for the New York Mets
 Nate Robertson – Major League Baseball player for the Florida Marlins
 Phil Stephenson – former Major League Baseball first baseman, head baseball coach for Dodge City Community College
 Eric Wedge – managed Major League Baseball's Seattle Mariners, head baseball coach at WSU

Basketball

 Jamie Arnold (born 1975) – American-Israeli professional basketball player
 Ron Baker – NBA player with the New York Knicks
 Nate Bowman – known as "The Snake"; National Basketball Association player
 Cal Bruton – American-Australian basketball player, NBL Hall of Famer
 Antoine Carr (born 1961) – NBA player
 John Cooper – head coach at Tennessee State University, assistant coach at Auburn University, University of Oregon, and University of South Carolina
 Cleanthony Early – NBA player most recently with the New York Knicks
 Warren Jabali – American Basketball Association player
 Cliff Levingston – NBA player
 Xavier McDaniel – NBA player
 Gal Mekel (born 1988) – Israeli basketball player formerly in the NBA and now with Maccabi Tel Aviv
 Toure' Murry – NBA player most recently with the Utah Jazz
 Joe Ragland (born 1989) –- American-Liberian basketball player for Hapoel Holon of the Israeli Basketball Premier League
 Dave Stallworth – NBA player
 Fred VanVleet – NBA player with the Toronto Raptors
 Gene Wiley – NBA player
 Landry Shamet – NBA player with the Phoenix Suns

Bowling
 Chris Barnes – PBA bowler (2007–08 PBA Player of the Year), USBC spokesperson
 Clara Guerrero – PWBA bowler
 Francois Lavoie – PBA bowler
 Kris Prather – PBA bowler
 Sean Rash – PBA bowler
 Rocio Restrepo – PWBA bowler

Football
 Margene Adkins – NFL player for Dallas Cowboys, New Orleans Saints and New York Jets
 Sam Adkins – NFL player for Seattle Seahawks, 1977–81; television personality for Seahawks broadcasts
 Jumpy Geathers – defensive tackle, played for the New Orleans Saints, Washington Redskins, Atlanta Falcons, and Denver Broncos, won two Super Bowls
 Randy Jackson – NFL player, 1972–74; survivor of the 1970 WSU football team plane crash; coached at Robinson Middle School in Wichita
 Bob Long – receiver for Green Bay Packers, Atlanta Falcons, Washington Redskins and Los Angeles Rams; three-time NFL champion (1965, 1966, 1967)
 Scot McCloughan – General Manager of the Washington Redskins
 Bill Parcells – Pro Football Hall of Fame coach, played linebacker at WSU
 Henry Schichtle – NFL and CFL player
 Nelson Toburen – linebacker for the Green Bay Packers; two-time NFL champion (1961, 1962)

Wrestling
 Paul Wight – professional wrestler known as "The Big Show", played basketball at WSU

Crime
 Eyad Ismoil – A perpetrator of the 1993 World Trade Center bombing. 
 Dennis Rader – BTK serial killer

See also

 Lists of people from Kansas

References

External links
 Wichita State University alumni association

Wichita State University people